The following is a list of Major League Baseball players, retired or active. As of the end of the 2010 season, there have been 53 players with a last name that begins with U who have been on a major league roster at some point.

U

References

External links 
Last Names starting with U – Baseball-Reference.com

 U